The EuroBrun ER189 and ER189B were Formula One cars built and raced by the EuroBrun team for the 1989 and 1990 Formula One seasons. The cars were designed by George Ryton and were powered by a normally aspirated Judd EV engine.

1989 
The ER189 debuted in the 1989 British Grand Prix, driven by Swiss Gregor Foitek, who failed to pre-qualify. Foitek was unable to get out of Friday pre-qualifying for the next three races and left the team after the 1989 Belgian Grand Prix. Oscar Larrauri, who had driven for the team the previous year, was called back to finish the season, although he failed to pre-qualify for a single race as well.

1990 
Ryton designed a revision, the ER189B, for the 1990 Formula One season. The team hired Brazilian Roberto Moreno and Italian Claudio Langes, and while the car was not bad there was no money for development, despite the best efforts of Dutch engineer Kees Van der Grint. Moreno only pre-qualified on five occasions and raced twice, finishing 13th in the 1990 United States Grand Prix, after qualifying 16th, ahead of Nigel Mansell. Langes never escaped from pre-qualifying. The team closed down at the end of the European season, and did not compete in the last two races of 1990.

Complete Formula One results 
(key)

References

External links 
 EuroBrun ER189 at statsf1.com
 EuroBrun ER189B at statsf1.com
 EuroBrun at grandprix.com
 EuroBrun at f1rejects.com

EuroBrun Formula One cars